The Chevrolet Corvette (C6) is the sixth generation of the Corvette sports car that was produced by Chevrolet division of General Motors for the 2005 to 2013 model years. It is the first Corvette with exposed headlamps (as opposed to hidden headlamps) since the 1962 model. Production variants include the Z06, ZR1, Grand Sport, and 427 Convertible. Racing variants include the C6.R, an American Le Mans Series GT1 championship and 24 Hours of Le Mans GTE-Pro winner.

Overview 

The Corvette C6 featured new bodywork with exposed headlamps, revised suspension geometry, a larger passenger compartment, a larger  V8 engine and a higher level of refinement. It is 5.1 inches (13 cm) shorter than the C5, but the wheelbase was increased by 1.2 inches (3 cm). It is also one inch (2.5 cm) narrower. Like the C5, the Corvette C6's suspension consisted of independent unequal-length double wishbones with transverse fiberglass mono-leaf springs and optional magnetorheological dampers.

With an automatic transmission, the Corvette achieves  /  mpg (city/highway) of fuel economy; the manual-transmission model gets  /  mpg of fuel economy. The Corvette's manual transmission is fitted with Computer Aided Gear Shifting (CAGS), obligating the driver to shift from 1st gear directly to the 4th gear when operating at lower RPM. This boosts the EPA's derived fuel economy thus allowing the buyer to avoid paying the "gas guzzler" tax. GM badges were added to the car in 2006.

Beginning with the 2008 model year, the Corvette received a new engine, the LS3. The previous Tremec T56 transmission on manual Corvettes was replaced with a new version, the TR6060, in the 2008 model year. From 2008 onward, the steering was revised for improved feel and the wheels were updated to a new five-spoke design. The last Corvette C6, a white 427 convertible, was completed on February 28, 2013.

Z06
 

The Z06 arrived for the 2006 model year as a homologation vehicle in the third quarter of 2005 and is the lightest of all Corvette models. The Z06 was equipped with the largest-displacement small-block engine ever produced, a new  V8 engine codenamed the LS7. Until the introduction of LT6 engine in October 2021, LS7 was the most powerful production naturally aspirated engine made by General Motors. In addition to the larger displacement engine, the Corvette Z06 has a dry sump oiling system, and connecting rods made out of titanium alloy. The frame of the Z06 is constructed from aluminum, saving  over the standard steel frame. Other weight saving measures such as balsa wood/carbon fiber composite floors and a magnesium alloy engine cradle were used. The Z06's body differentiates itself from the standard Corvette with its larger front and rear fenders and an intake inlet scoop on the front bumper. The front fenders are constructed with carbon fiber and the rear fenders contain ducts to aid in cooling the rear brakes. The Z06 was the official pace car for both the 2006 Daytona 500 and the Indianapolis 500 race. The Z06 contains the following enhancements over the standard C6 Corvette:

Hand-built LS7 V8 with dry sump oiling system
Aluminum chassis with fixed roof
Larger/stiffer anti-sway bars
Stiffer springs and shocks
Larger rear spoiler and front splitter
Transmission cooler
Unique front fascia with intake inlet
Wider carbon fiber front and fiberglass rear fenders
Functional front and rear brake ducts for added brake system cooling
Unique light weight forged aluminum 18-inch front and 19-inch rear wheels; painted finish standard and chromed finish optional
Wider 275/35ZR18 tires in the front and wider 325/30ZR19 tires in the rear
Larger 6-piston front and 4-piston rear calipers, including cross-drilled  front rotors and  rear rotors
Optional 1LZ, 2LZ, and 3LZ trim packages.

For the 2011 model year, the Z06 carbon edition was introduced, which carries over multiple parts from the high performance ZR1 including carbon ceramic brakes, active suspension, and other carbon fiber aerodynamic pieces. Only 500 were planned for production and actual production numbers were much lower, in total only about 250 were made. The 250 were optioned the same but did not have the carbon hood. In 2012 and 2013, these options could be ordered through the Z07 package on the Z06. Additionally, it was only available in exterior colors Inferno Orange and Supersonic Blue, and the interior was decked out unique Z06 Carbon emblem accents.

ZR1

The ZR1 is the high performance variant of the Z06 and was first reported by several print and online publications, based on rumors that General Motors was developing a production version of the Corvette above the Z06 level under the internal code name Blue Devil (named after CEO Rick Wagoner's alma mater, Duke University).

The October 12, 2006 issue of AutoWeek published photos by photographer Chris Doane of a C6 Z06 with special auto-manufacturer-issued license plates with a hood bulge, widely thought to confirm the presence of a supercharger on the Blue Devil. Other names attached to the project included Corvette SS, after the late '50 racing car, and Corvette Z07. In February 2007, a worker at a Michigan shipping company posted pictures online of a powertrain development mule that was being shipped to Germany, believed to be part of the Blue Devil program. The car had manufacturer's license plates, carbon-ceramic disc brakes, enlarged fender vents, a hood bulge, and an engine with a positive-displacement supercharger in the valley between the cylinder banks and a water-to-air intercooler atop it.
GM began to release details on the Blue Devil project in April 2007. The company confirmed the existence of the project in an interview with Car and Driver on April 13. Motor Trend confirmed the official name for the production version of the Blue Devil, resurrecting the old ZR1 nameplate. The ZR1 had originally been used on developmental cars in 1971, and again as ZR-1 as the top of the line variant of the C4 Corvette. General Motors officially introduced the Corvette ZR1 on December 19, giving a press release and photographs of the car.

Carbon fiber is used on the roof, hood, fenders, front splitter, and rocker moldings; the hood and fenders are painted over, while the roof and splitter are merely covered in a clear-coat, retaining their original black color. A polycarbonate window is placed in the center of the hood, allowing the engine intercooler to be seen from the exterior. The wheels were the largest ever placed on a production Corvette, with both front and rear wheels increasing in size and diameter over the Z06. Carbon-ceramic brakes are included. The brake calipers are painted blue, as are the engine intercooler trim and the ZR1 logo. Magnetic Selective Ride Control was also included on the car, with sensors to automatically adjust stiffness levels based on road conditions and vehicle movement.

Grand Sport 

The 2010 Grand Sport was unveiled at the 12th annual C5/C6 Corvette Birthday Bash, held at the National Corvette Museum. The Grand Sport replaces the previous Z51 option. The GS or Grand Sport was equipped with the following enhancements:

Specific manual transmission with different gear ratios 
Larger/stiffer anti-sway bars
Stiffer springs
Revised shocks
Larger Z06 rear spoiler
Transmission cooler
Functional front and rear brake ducts for added brake system cooling
Unique light weight forged aluminum 18-inch front and 19-inch rear wheels (painted finish standard and chromed finish optional)
Z06 brakes, including cross-drilled  front rotors and  rear rotors
Specific rear axle ratio on automatic transmission equipped models 
Optional 1LT, 2LT, 3LT and 4LT trim packages.
Wider front and rear fenders with integrated Grand Sport badges
Wider 275/35ZR18 tires in the front
Wider 325/30ZR19 tires in the rear
6-piston front calipers and 4-piston rear calipers
Dry-sump oil system (manual transmission coupes only)
Hand-built LS3 6.2 L V8 (manual transmission coupes only)
launch control (manual only)

Engines

The LS2 was replaced by LS3 from model years 2008–2013.

The LS3 engine in the GS convertible or Grand Sport coupé equipped with an automatic transmission has wet sump instead of dry sump lubrication.

Limited editions

Ron Fellows ALMS GT1 Championship Edition (2007)
The Ron Fellows ALMS GT1 Championship Edition is a special edition of the Corvette Z06 developed to commemorate the victory of the Corvette racing team driver Ron Fellows at the 2007 ALMS GT1 championship. Notable exterior features include special Arctic White paint, red grand sport style stripes on the front fenders and red and silver hash styled stripes incorporating a maple leaf similar to the livery present on the winning car. The interior had a red interior and complemented accenting on the seats, console and door panels. The arm rest features Ron Fellows' signature. Only 399 were made with 33 destined to the Canadian market.

ZHZ (2008)

The ZHZ was a standard Corvette equipped with the LS3 engine, 6-speed automatic transmission, vacuum actuated valve exhaust, F55 suspension and unique 7-spoke chrome wheels. It was developed for The Hertz Corporation's Fun Collection for 2008. 500 targa tops in 2008 and 350 convertibles were produced in 2009 in total. All cars were finished in yellow with a broad black stripe along the hood and roof.

GT1 Championship Edition (2009)
The GT1 Championship Edition is an optional package for the C6 that was unveiled in the 2009 New York Auto Show. It celebrates the Corvette C6.R's entry into the GT1 class of ALMS in 2009. This limited edition is based on either a 4LT equipped targa top, 4LT convertible or high performance Z06. Models wear the same velocity yellow "45U" body hue that adorns the C6.R or "41U" gloss black, along with a "Jake" graphic that spans the Championship edition's hood. Chrome wheels known as Gumby's are present on the targa top and convertible while the Z06 is fitted with chrome Spyder wheels. A body-colored spoiler shared with the ZR1 joins a "carbon pattern" engine cover, while a leather-wrapped ebony interior contains "GT1" embroidered on the head rests of the seats, the instrument panel and a center console armrest. Non-Z06 models also include a Z51 Performance Package and NPP Performance exhaust.

Original production numbers were slated to be 100 units of each model in each color (600 total), each carrying a premium over the standard models. But actual numbers amounted to 125 units in various numbers for each color code. This was due to the government takeover of General Motors.

Z06 Carbon Limited Edition (2011)
The Z06 Carbon Limited Edition was available as a 2011 model beginning in the summer of 2010. The car was available in two colors: Inferno Orange and an all-new Supersonic Blue. On the exterior, the car had black headlamps and mirrors, a ZR1-style spoiler, carbon fiber hood, and black carbon fiber rockers and splitter. Inside, the Z06 Carbon has ebony leather and suede seats with body color-matching stitching. Other improvements include Magnetic Selective Ride Control, a special carbon engine cover, 20-spoke black 19-inch front/20-inch rear wheels, and ZR1's carbon ceramic Brembo brakes. Although Chevrolet planned to sell 500 of the Z06 Carbon Limited Edition, only 252 units were produced.

Centennial Edition (2012) 
Order code "ZLC" was an equipment package celebrating 100 years of racing heritage of Chevrolet. Offered exclusively in Carbon Flash Metallic, the Centennial Edition kit includes satin-black graphics and unique lightweight cast-spun aluminum Centennial Satin Black wheels that feature a thin red perimeter outline (on Z06 and ZR1 cars). All cars came with red brake calipers and featured Magnetic Selective Ride Control.

Inside, the car featured ebony leather upholstery and contrast stitching while the steering wheel and armrests featured microfiber suede accents. The headrests have an embossed Centennial Edition logo and the steering wheel hub carries the same "Louis Chevrolet 100" graphic found on the car's B-pillar and wheel center caps.

Cadillac XLR

The Cadillac XLR is a luxury roadster that was marketed by Cadillac from 2004 to 2009 model years. Assembled in Bowling Green, Kentucky, the XLR was based on the Chevrolet Corvette's Y platform. Designed to be a grand touring offering, the XLR featured different exterior and interior design, standard adaptive suspension system, a 4.6-liter Northstar V8 engine, and a power-retractable aluminum hardtop.

Production notes

Total: 215,223 units.

Concept cars

Z06X

The Z06X was designed to be a factory built road race car similar to cars like the Porsche 911 GT3 Cup and Dodge Viper ACR-X. The concept car was built by GM with the help of Pratt & Miller Engineering. The Z06X, introduced in 2010, featured racecar components such as: carbon fiber adjustable rear wing, carbon fiber front splitter, full roll cage, fire suppression system, race seat, harness, carbon ceramic brakes, upgraded cooling system, polycarbonate rear window, adjustable coilovers, adjustable sway bars, and tow hooks; the radio, interior carpeting and sound-deadening materials have been removed.  The suspension system was designed and supplied by Pfadt Race Engineering.

Racing

C6.R

The C6.R was a replacement for the C5-R, built by Pratt & Miller, and unveiled for its first competition at the 2005 12 Hours of Sebring endurance race of the American Le Mans Series. It came in second and third in its class, just behind the new Aston Martin DBR9 race car. It was put on display a week later at the New York International Auto Show next to the Z06.

In 2006, the Corvette C6.R won both American Le Mans GT1 Championships: Teams and Manufacturers. On March 17, 2007 it won the GT1 class in the 12 Hours of Sebring.

For Le Mans 2007, four C6.R's were on the entry list, the two Corvette Racing entries joined by single entries from the Luc Alphand Aventures and PSI-Motorsport teams.

The heart of the C6.R, its LS7.R motor, was crowned as Global Motorsport Engine of the Year by a jury of 50 race engine engineers on the Professional Motorsport World Expo 2006 in Cologne, Germany.

As the GT1 class dwindled, Corvette Racing switched to the GT2 class during the 2009 ALMS season.

For 2011, the aerodynamics of the ALMS cars were modified to be similar to the ZR1. This car has since won the 2011 24 Hours of Le Mans in the GTE-Pro and GTE-Am classes. In 2012, the Corvette C6.R won again in the GTE-Am category.

In addition to the American Le Mans Series, Corvette C6.Rs also race in the FIA GT1 World Championship. The GT1 cars are given more power and have less aerodynamics restrictions than the Le Mans cars, which follow GT2 regulations.

Riley GT

Riley Technologies built a GT2-class Chevrolet Corvette for the 2008 American Le Mans Series. The car also raced at the 2009 Petit Le Mans, where it beat both Pratt & Miller-built factory cars in qualifying.

Z06-R

Entered in the FIA GT3 European Championship series as a GT3 class car, the Z06-R is a modified production Z06. Changes were necessary to make the car endurance race ready. These include a stripped interior, full rollcage for safety, center-locking wheels, carbon fiber doors, rear deck spoiler and front splitter. The LS7 and LS3-engine and drivetrain are built by APP Racing Engines from the Netherlands. The car is not road legal.

Eight Z06-R were constructed by Callaway Competition GmbH in Leingarten, Germany, for the 2006 season. The French team Riverside campaigned a three car team.  The Z06R won the FIA GT3 European Championship in its second year of entry. By 2011, all Z06-R teams discontinued their racing efforts in GT3, ending the car's FIA career. Z06-Rs are also campaigned in national championships.

See also
 List of Nürburgring Nordschleife lap times

References

Notes

Bibliography

External links
Chevrolet Corvette C6 at National Corvette Museum
Official C6 Vette Registry

C6
2010s cars
Cars introduced in 2005
Cars discontinued in 2013
Front mid-engine, rear-wheel-drive vehicles